Gabriel Bridge (between Wakaw and Rosthern in Saskatchewan, Canada) is a steel truss bridge named after Gabriel Dumont. Gabriel Bridge replaced the Gabriel Ferry Crossing in 1989.

Gabriel Dumont operated a ferry on the South Saskatchewan River (in the same area as the bridge) from the early 1870s to 1883. According to Dumont's 1878 license, the ferry was a scow measuring 7.6m (23 feet) by 4m (12 feet). Ferry service continued near Gabriel's crossing until the completion of Gabriel's Bridge on Highway 312 in 1969.

See also 
List of crossings of the South Saskatchewan River

References 

Bridges in Saskatchewan
Steel bridges in Canada
1989 establishments in Saskatchewan
Bridges completed in 1989
Truss bridges in Canada